NGC 3336 is a barred spiral galaxy located about 190 million light-years away in the constellation Hydra. It was discovered by astronomer John Herschel on March 24, 1835. NGC 3336 is a member of the Hydra Cluster.

A supernova of an unknown type was discovered in NGC 3336 on December 20, 1984. It was designated as SN 1984S.

See also 
 NGC 3307

References

External links

Hydra Cluster
Hydra (constellation)
Barred spiral galaxies
3336
31754
Astronomical objects discovered in 1835
Discoveries by John Herschel